Justice Weber may refer to:

Albert J. Weber (1859–1925), associate justice of the Utah Supreme Court
Fred J. Weber (1919–2007), associate justice of the Montana Supreme Court

See also
Donald W. Webber (1906–1995), associate justice of the Maine Supreme Judicial Court
Judge Weber (disambiguation)